Hassi Messaoud is a town in Ouargla Province, eastern Algeria, located  southeast of Ouargla. As of 2008 it had a population of 45,147 people, up from 40,360 in 1998, and an annual population growth rate of 1.1%, the lowest in the province. Oil was discovered there in 1956 and the town's prominence has grown rapidly since then; it is considered as the First Energy town in Algeria where all the big oil and gas companies have offices and bases. It is an oil refinery town named after the first oil well. A water well, dug in 1917, can be found on the airport side of town. Today there are over 800 wells within a  radius of the town.

History 

The Name Hassi Messaoud means "the well of Messaoud" in Arabic, named after Messaoud Rouabeh, a well-digger in the region. Before the discovery of oil in the region, Hassi Messaoud was not very populated. After discovering oil in the region in the 1950s the French built two petroleum bases. After the nationalization of oil and gas in the early 70s, the  bases became property of Sonatrach (the national oil and gas company).

In 1984, and after a new administrative zoning, Hassi Messaoud became a municipality (a local district) with a local assembly. After that date people started populating the town independently. Sonatrach has imported ready-built houses, approximately 2000 units. Now Hassi Messaoud is a town with more than 60,000 inhabitants (non official source), without counting those living in the oil and gas company bases. The town contains several bases for the oil and gas companies, where Algerian and foreign people are working and living. As of 2008, Hassi Messaoud has an oil field with estimated reserves of 8 billion barrels, and the Hassi R ̓Mel gasfield has estimated reserves of 50 trillion cubic feet of gas and 2 billion barrels of crude oil.

Attacks against women

In 2010 Amnesty International reported that mob attacks against single women accused of being prostitutes were taking place in Hassi Messaoud. According to Amnesty International there are reports that "some women have been sexually abused" and were targeted "not just because they are women, but because they are living alone and are economically independent."

Climate 
Hassi Messaoud has a hot desert climate (Köppen climate classification BWh) with long, extremely hot summers and short, warm winters and little rainfall throughout the year.

Sand storms are common before summer time (from March to June), lasting from 6 hours to 4 days. These storms vary in their intensity but in general they prevent any outdoors activity and driving becomes very hazardous.

Transportation 
The town has a coach and taxi station which serves all major cities in the country. It is served by the Oued Irara Airport, located 8.5 km southeast of the city centre. It features domestic scheduled passenger service.
Hassi Messaoud lies on the N3 national highway between Touggourt and Biskra to the north and Illizi and Djanet to the south. To the north of the town, the N49 branches off the N3 to the west, connecting to Ouargla.

Localities
The commune is composed of seven localities:

Centre Ville Hassi Messaoud
Haoud El Hamra
Gassi Touil
Nezla
Oued Tayeh
El Gassi
Irara

Geology
The Hassi Messaoud oil field is a Cambrian sandstone reservoir 270 m thick in a dome 3300 m deep and 1300 km2 in area of the Oued Mya structural basin.  The top of the dome is marked by an unconformity at the base of the Triassic, Mesozoic sediments consisting of salt, anhydrite, shale, limestone, dolomite and marl, all overlain by Mio-Pliocene sandstone.  A refraction seismic survey showed the structure and the Md No. 1 well discovered oil in 1956.

References

External links
 hassimessaoud.info - a website for oil industry operators in Hassi Messaoud

Neighbouring towns and cities

Communes of Ouargla Province
Natural gas fields in Algeria
Energy in Algeria
Ouargla Province